See also Zen for an overview of Zen, Chan Buddhism for the Chinese origins, and Sōtō, Rinzai and Ōbaku for the three main schools of Zen in Japan

Japanese Zen refers to the Japanese forms of Zen Buddhism, an originally Chinese Mahāyāna school of Buddhism that strongly emphasizes dhyāna, the meditative training of awareness and equanimity. This practice, according to Zen proponents, gives insight into one's true nature, or the emptiness of inherent existence, which opens the way to a liberated way of living.

History

Origins

According to tradition, Zen originated in India, when Gautama Buddha held up a flower and Mahākāśyapa smiled. With this smile he showed that he had understood the wordless essence of the dharma. This way the dharma was transmitted to Mahākāśyapa, the second patriarch of Zen.

The term Zen is derived from the Japanese pronunciation of the Middle Chinese word 禪 (chán), an abbreviation of 禪那 (chánnà), which is a Chinese transliteration of the Sanskrit word of dhyāna ("meditation"). Buddhism was introduced from India to China in the first century AD. According to tradition, Chan was introduced around 500 C.E. by Bodhidharma, an Indian monk teaching dhyāna. He was the 28th Indian patriarch of Zen and the first Chinese patriarch.

Early Japanese Zen 
Zen was first introduced into Japan as early as 653-656 C.E. in the Asuka period (538–710 C.E.), at the time when the set of Zen monastic regulations was still nonexistent and Chan masters were willing to instruct anyone regardless of buddhist ordination. Dōshō (道昭, 629–700 C.E.) went over to China in 653 C.E., where he learned Chan from the famed Chinese pilgrim Xuanzang (玄奘, 602 – 664 C.E.), and he studied more fully with a disciple of the second Chinese patriarch, Huike (慧可, 487–593 C.E.) . After returning home, Dōshō established the Hossō school, basing it on Yogācāra philosophy and built a Meditation Hall for the purpose of practising Zen in the Gangō-ji in Nara. In the Nara period (710 to 794 C.E.), the Chan master, Dao-xuan (道璿, 702-760 C.E.), arrived in Japan, he taught meditation techniques to the monk Gyōhyō (行表, 720–797 C.E.), who in turn was to instruct Saichō (最澄, 767-822 C.E.), founder of the Japanese Tendai sect of Buddhism. Saicho visited Tang China in 804 C.E. as part of an official embassy sent by Emperor Kammu (桓武天皇, 781-806 C.E.). There he studied four branches of Buddhism including Chan and Tiantai, which he was, by that time, already familiar with.

The first attempt of establishing Zen as an independent doctrine was in 815, when the Chinese monk Yikong (義空) visited Japan as the representative of Chan's Southern-school lineage, based on the teachings of the master Mazu Daoyi (馬祖道一, 709–788 C.E.), who was the mentor of Baizhang (百丈懐海, 720–814 C.E.), the supposed author of the initial set of Zen monastic regulations. Yikong arrived in 815 C.E. and tried unsuccessfully to transmit Zen systematically to the eastern nation. It is recorded in an inscription left at the famous Rashõmon gate protecting the southern entryway to Kyoto that, on leaving to return to China, Yikong said he was aware of the futility of his efforts due to hostility and opposition he experienced from the dominant Tendai Buddhist school. What existed of Zen in the Heian period (794-1185 C.E.) was incorporated into and subordinate to the Tendai tradition . The early phase of Japanese Zen has been labeled "syncretic" because Chan teachings and practices were initially combined with familiar Tendai and Shingon forms.

Kamakura (1185–1333 C.E.) 

Zen found difficulties in establishing itself as a separate school in Japan until the 12th century, largely  because of  opposition, influence, power and criticism by the Tendai school. During the Kamakura period (1185–1333 C.E.),  Nōnin established the first independent Zen school on Japanese soil, known as the short-lived and disapproved Daruma school. In 1189 Nōnin sent two students to China, to meet with Cho-an Te-kuang (1121–1203 C.E.), and ask for the recognition of Nōnin as a Zen-master. This recognition was granted.

In 1168 C.E., Eisai traveled to China, whereafter he studied Tendai for twenty years. In 1187 C.E. he went to China again, and returned to establish a local branch of the Linji school, which is known in Japan as the Rinzai school. Decades later,  (1235–1308 C.E.) also studied Linji teachings in China before founding the Japanese Ōtōkan lineage, the most influential branch of Rinzai.

In 1215 C.E., Dōgen, a younger contemporary of Eisai's, journeyed to China himself, where he became a disciple of the Caodong master Rujing. After his return, Dōgen established the Sōtō school, the Japanese branch of Caodong.

Zen fit the way of life of the samurai: confronting death without fear, and acting in a spontaneous and intuitive way.

During this period the Five Mountain System was established, which institutionalized an influential part of the Rinzai school. It consisted of the five most famous Zen temples of Kamakura: Kenchō-ji, Engaku-ji, Jufuku-ji, Jōmyō-ji and Jōchi-ji.

Muromachi (or Ashikaga) (1336–1573 C.E.) 

During the Muromachi period the Rinzai school was the most successful of the schools, since it was favoured by the shōgun.

Gozan-system
In the beginning of the Muromachi period the Gozan system was fully worked out. The final version contained five temples of both Kyoto and Kamakura. A second tier of the system consisted of Ten Temples. This system was extended throughout Japan, effectively giving control to the central government, which administered this system. The monks, often well educated and skilled, were employed by the shōgun for the governing of state affairs.

Rinka-monasteries
Not all Rinzai Zen organisations were under such strict state control. The Rinka monasteries, which were primarily located in rural areas rather than cities, had a greater degree of independence.  The O-to-kan lineage, that centered on Daitoku-ji, also had a greater degree of freedom. It was founded by Nampo Jomyo, Shuho Myocho, and Kanzan Egen. A well-known teacher from Daitoku-ji was Ikkyū.

Another Rinka lineage was the Hotto lineage, of which Bassui Tokushō is the best-known teacher.

Azuchi-Momoyama (1573–1600 C.E.) and Edo (or Tokugawa) (1600–1868 C.E.) 

After a period of war Japan was re-united in the Azuchi–Momoyama period. This decreased the power of Buddhism, which had become a strong political and military force in Japan. Neo-Confucianism gained influence at the expense of Buddhism, which came under strict state control. Japan closed the gates to the rest of the world. The only traders to be allowed were Dutchmen admitted to the island of Dejima. New doctrines and methods were not to be introduced, nor were new temples and schools. The only exception was the Ōbaku lineage, which was introduced in the 17th century during the Edo period by Ingen, a Chinese monk. Ingen had been a member of the Linji school, the Chinese equivalent of Rinzai, which had developed separately from the Japanese branch for hundreds of years. Thus, when Ingen journeyed to Japan following the fall of the Ming dynasty to the Manchu people, his teachings were seen as a separate school. The Ōbaku school was named after , which had been Ingen's home in China.

Well-known Zen masters from this period are Bankei, Bashō and Hakuin. Bankei Yōtaku (盤珪永琢?, 1622–1693 C.E.) became a classic example of a man driven by the "great doubt". Matsuo Bashō (松尾 芭蕉?, 1644 – November 28, 1694) became a great Zen poet. In the 18th century Hakuin Ekaku (白隠 慧鶴?, 1686–1768) revived the Rinzai school. His influence was so immense that almost all contemporary Rinzai lineages are traced back to him.

Meiji Restoration (1868–1912 C.E.) and Imperial expansionism (1912–1945 C.E.) 
The Meiji period (1868–1912 C.E.) saw the Emperor's power reinstated after a coup in 1868 C.E.. At that time Japan was forced to open to Western trade which brought influence and, eventually, a restructuring of all government and commercial structures to Western standards.  Shinto became the officiated state religion and Buddhism was coerced to adapt to the new regime. The Buddhist establishment saw the Western world as a threat, but also as a challenge to stand up to.

Buddhist institutions had a simple choice: adapt or perish. Rinzai and Soto Zen chose to adapt, trying to modernize Zen in accord with Western insights, while simultaneously maintaining a Japanese identity. This Japanese identity was being articulated in the Nihonjinron philosophy, the "Japanese uniqueness" theory. A broad range of subjects was taken as typical of Japanese culture. D.T. Suzuki contributed to the Nihonjinron-philosophy by taking Zen as the distinctive token of Asian spirituality, showing its unique character in the Japanese culture

This resulted in support for the war activities of the Japanese imperial system by the Japanese Zen establishment—including the Sōtō sect, the major branches of Rinzai, and several renowned teachers. According to Sharf,

War endeavours against Russia, China and finally during the Pacific War were supported by the Zen establishment.

A notable work on this subject was Zen at War (1998) by Brian Victoria, an American-born Sōtō priest. One of his assertions was that some Zen masters known for their post-war internationalism and promotion of "world peace" were open Japanese nationalists in the inter-war years. Among them as an example Hakuun Yasutani, the founder of the Sanbo Kyodan School, even voiced antisemitic and nationalistic opinions after World War II. Only after international protests in the 1990s, following the publication of Victoria's 'Zen at war', did the Sanbo Kyodan express apologies for this support This involvement was not limited to the Zen schools, as all orthodox Japanese schools of Buddhism supported the militarist state. Victoria's particular claims about D. T. Suzuki's involvement in militarism have been much disputed by other scholars.

Criticisms of post-WWII Zen
Some contemporary Japanese Zen teachers, such as Harada Daiun Sogaku and Shunryū Suzuki, have criticized Japanese Zen as being a formalized system of empty rituals in which very few Zen practitioners ever actually attained realization. For example, the Sōtō school published statistics stating that 80 percent of laity visited temples only for reasons having to do with funerals and death.

Teachings

Buddha-nature and sunyata

Mahayana Buddhism teaches śūnyatā, "emptiness", which is also emphasized by Zen. But another important doctrine is the buddha-nature, the idea that all human beings have the possibility to awaken. All living creatures are supposed to have the Buddha-nature, but don't realize this as long as they are not awakened. The doctrine of an essential nature can easily lead to the idea that there is an unchanging essential nature or reality behind the changing world of appearances.

The difference and reconciliation of these two doctrines is the central theme of the Laṅkāvatāra Sūtra.

Kensho: seeing one's true nature

The primary goal of Rinzai Zen is kensho, seeing one's true nature, and mujodo no taigen, expression of this insight in daily life.

Seeing one's true nature means seeing that there is no essential 'I' or 'self', that our true nature is empty.

Expression in daily life means that this is not only a contemplative insight, but that our lives are expressions of this selfless existence.

Zen meditation

Zen emphasizes zazen, meditation c.q. dhyana in a sitting position. In Soto, the emphasis is on shikantaza, 'just sitting', while Rinzai also uses koans to train the mind. In alternation with zazen, there is walking meditation, kinhin, in which one walks with full attention.

To facilitate insight, a Zen teacher can assign a kōan. This is a short anecdote, which seems irrational, but contains subtle references to the Buddhist teachings. An example of a kōan is Joshu's 'Mu': A monk asked: "Does a dog have buddha-nature?" Joshu responded: "Mu!"

Zen-meditation aims at "non-thinking," in Japanese fu shiryō and hi shiryō. According to Zhu, the two terms negate two different cognitive functions both called manas in Yogacara, namely "intentionality" or self-centered thinking, and "discriminative thinking" (vikalpa). The usage of two different terms for "non-thinking" points to a crucial difference between Sōtō and Rinzai in their interpretation of the negation of these two cognitive functions. According to Rui, Rinzai Zen starts with hi shiryō, negating discriminative thinking, and culminates in fu shiryō, negating intentional or self-centered thinking; Sōtō starts with fu shiryō, which is displaced and absorbed by hi shiryō.

Contemporary Zen organizations
The traditional institutional traditions (su) of Zen in contemporary Japan are Sōtō, Rinzai, and Ōbaku. Sōtō and Rinzai dominate, while Ōbaku is smaller. Besides these there are modern Zen organizations which have especially attracted Western lay followers, namely the Sanbo Kyodan and the FAS Society.

Sōtō
Sōtō emphasizes meditation and the inseparable nature of practice and insight. Its founder Dogen is still highly revered. Soto is characterized by its flexibility and openness. No commitment to study is expected and practice can be resumed voluntarily.

Rinzai
Rinzai emphasizes kōan study and kensho. The Rinzai organisation includes fifteen subschools based on temple affiliation. The best known of these main temples are Myoshin-ji, Nanzen-ji, Tenryū-ji, Daitoku-ji, and Tofuku-ji. Rinzai is characterized by its stringent regiments of meditation through every second of life. Whether a practitioner is practicing seated meditation, walking meditation, working, or even out in public, meditation can be applied to each instance of a Rinzai student's life.

Obaku
Ōbaku is a small branch, which organizationally, is part of the Rinzai school.

Sanbo Kyodan

The Sanbo Kyodan is a small Japanese school, established by Hakuun Yasutani, which has been very influential in the West. Well-known teachers from this school are Philip Kapleau and Taizan Maezumi. Maezumi's influence stretches further through his dharma heirs, such as Joko Beck, Tetsugen Bernard Glassman, and especially Dennis Merzel, who has appointed more than a dozen dharma heirs.

FAS Society
The FAS Society is a non-sectarian organization, founded by Shin'ichi Hisamatsu. Its aim is to modernize Zen and adapt it to the modern world. In Europe it is influential through such teachers as Jeff Shore and Ton Lathouwers.

Zen in the Western world

Early influences
Although it is difficult to trace when the West first became aware of Zen as a distinct form of Buddhism, the visit of Soyen Shaku, a Japanese Zen monk, to Chicago during the World Parliament of Religions in 1893 is often pointed to as an event that enhanced its profile in the Western world. It was during the late 1950s and the early 1960s that the number of Westerners pursuing a serious interest in Zen, other than descendants of Asian immigrants, reached a significant level.

Eugen Herrigel's book Zen in the Art of Archery describing his training in the Zen-influenced martial art of Kyūdō, inspired many of the Western world's early Zen practitioners. However, many scholars, such as Yamada Shoji, are quick to criticize this book.

D.T. Suzuki
The single most influential person for the spread of Zen Buddhism was D. T. Suzuki. A lay student of Zen, he became acquainted with Western culture at a young age. He wrote many books on Zen which became widely read in the Western world, but he has been criticised for giving a one-sided and overly romanticized vision of Zen.

Reginald Horace Blyth (1898–1964) was an Englishman who went to Japan in 1940 to further his study of Zen. He was interned during World War II and started writing in prison. While imprisoned he met Robert Aitken, who was later to become a roshi in the Sanbo Kyodan lineage. Blyth was tutor to the Crown Prince after the war. His greatest work is the 5-volume "Zen and Zen Classics", published in the 1960s. Here he discusses Zen themes from a philosophical standpoint, often in conjunction with Christian elements in a comparative spirit. His essays include "God, Buddha, and Buddhahood" and "Zen, Sin, and Death".

Beat Zen
The British philosopher Alan Watts took a close interest in Zen Buddhism and wrote and lectured extensively on it during the 1950s. He understood Zen as a vehicle for a mystical transformation of consciousness, and also as a historical example of a non-Western, non-Christian way of life that had fostered both the practical and fine arts.

The Dharma Bums, a novel written by Jack Kerouac and published in 1959, gave its readers a look at how a fascination with Buddhism and Zen was being absorbed into the bohemian lifestyles of a small group of American youths, primarily on the West Coast. Beside the narrator, the main character in this novel was "Japhy Ryder", a thinly veiled depiction of Gary Snyder. The story was based on actual events taking place while Snyder prepared, in California, for the formal Zen studies that he would pursue in Japanese monasteries between 1956 and 1968.

Christian Zen
Thomas Merton (1915–1968) was a Catholic Trappist monk and priest. Like his friend, the late D.T. Suzuki, Merton believed that there must be a little of Zen in all authentic creative and spiritual experience. The dialogue between Merton and Suzuki explores the many congruencies of Christian mysticism and Zen.

Hugo Enomiya-Lassalle (1898–1990) was a Jesuit who became a missionary in Japan in 1929. In 1956 he started to study Zen with Harada Daiun Sogaku. He was the superior of Heinrich Dumoulin, the well-known author on the history of Zen. Enomiya-lassalle introduced Westerners to Zen meditation.

Robert Kennedy (roshi), a Catholic Jesuit priest, professor, psychotherapist and Zen roshi in the White Plum lineage has written a number of books about what he labels as the benefits of Zen practice to Christianity. He was ordained a Catholic priest in Japan in 1965, and studied with Yamada Koun in Japan in the 1970s. He was installed as a Zen teacher of the White Plum Asanga lineage in 1991 and was given the title 'Roshi' in 1997.

In 1989, the Vatican released a document which states some Catholic appreciation of the use of Zen in Christian prayer. According to the text none of the methods proposed by non-Christian religions should be rejected out of hand simply because they are not Christian:

Zen and the art of...
While Zen and the Art of Motorcycle Maintenance, by Robert M. Pirsig, was a 1974 bestseller, it in fact has little to do with Zen as a religious practice, nor with motorcycle maintenance for that matter. Rather it deals with the notion of the metaphysics of "quality" from the point of view of the main character. Pirsig was attending the Minnesota Zen Center at the time of writing the book. He has stated that, despite its title, the book "should in no way be associated with that great body of factual information relating to orthodox Zen Buddhist practice". Though it may not deal with orthodox Zen Buddhist practice, Pirsig's book in fact deals with many of the more subtle facets of Zen living and Zen mentality without drawing attention to any religion or religious organization.

A number of contemporary authors have explored the relationship between Zen and a number of other disciplines, including parenting, teaching, and leadership. This typically involves the use of Zen stories to explain leadership strategies.

Art
In Europe, the Expressionist and Dada movements in art tend to have much in common thematically with the study of kōans and actual Zen. The early French surrealist René Daumal translated D.T. Suzuki as well as Sanskrit Buddhist texts.

Western Zen lineages derived from Japan
Over the last fifty years mainstream forms of Zen, led by teachers who trained in East Asia and their successors, have begun to take root in the West.

United States

Sanbo Kyodan
In North America, the Zen lineages derived from the Sanbo Kyodan school are the most numerous. The Sanbo Kyodan is a Japan-based reformist Zen group, founded in 1954 by Yasutani Hakuun, which has had a significant influence on Zen in the West. Sanbo Kyodan Zen is based primarily on the Soto tradition, but also incorporates Rinzai-style kōan practice. Yasutani's approach to Zen first became prominent in the English-speaking world through Philip Kapleau's book The Three Pillars of Zen (1965), which was one of the first books to introduce Western audiences to Zen as a practice rather than simply a philosophy. Among the Zen groups in North America, Hawaii, Europe, and New Zealand which derive from Sanbo Kyodan are those associated with Kapleau, Robert Aitken, and John Tarrant.

The most widespread are the lineages founded by Hakuyu Taizan Maezumi and the White Plum Asanga. Maezumi's successors include Susan Myoyu Andersen, John Daido Loori, Chozen Bays, Tetsugen Bernard Glassman, Dennis Merzel, Nicolee Jikyo McMahon, Joan Hogetsu Hoeberichts, and Charlotte Joko Beck.

Soto
Soto has gained prominence via Shunryu Suzuki, who established the San Francisco Zen Center. In 1967 the Center established Tassajara, the first Zen Monastery in America, in the mountains near Big Sur.

The Katagiri lineage, founded by Dainin Katagiri, has a significant presence in the Midwest. Note that both Taizan Maezumi and Dainin Katagiri served as priests at Zenshuji Soto Mission in the 1960s.

Taisen Deshimaru, a student of Kodo Sawaki, was a Soto Zen priest from Japan who taught in France. The International Zen Association, which he founded, remains influential. The American Zen Association, headquartered at the New Orleans Zen Temple, is one of the North American organizations practicing in the Deshimaru tradition.

Soyu Matsuoka established the Long Beach Zen Buddhist Temple and Zen Center in 1971, where he resided until his death in 1998. The Temple was headquarters to Zen centers in Atlanta, Chicago, Los Angeles, Seattle, and Everett, Washington.
Matsuoka created several dharma heirs, three of whom are still alive and leading Zen teachers within the lineage: Hogaku ShoZen McGuire, Zenkai Taiun Michael Elliston Sensei, and Kaiten John Dennis Govert.

Brad Warner is a Soto priest appointed by Gudo Wafu Nishijima. He is not a traditional Zen teacher, but is influential via his blogs on Zen.

Rinzai
Rinzai gained prominence in the West via D.T. Suzuki and the lineage of Soen Nakagawa and his student Eido Shimano. Soen Nakagawa had personal ties to Yamada Koun, the dharma heir of Hakuun Yasutani, who founded the Sanbo Kyodan. They established Dai Bosatsu Zendo Kongo-ji in New York. In Europe there is Havredal Zendo established by a Dharma Heir of Eido Shimano, Egmund Sommer (Denko Mortensen).

Some of the more prominent Rinzai Zen centers in North America include Rinzai-ji founded by Kyozan Joshu Sasaki Roshi in California, Chozen-ji founded by Omori Sogen Roshi in Hawaii, Daiyuzenji founded by Dogen Hosokawa Roshi (a student of Omori Sogen Roshi) in Chicago, Illinois, and Chobo-Ji founded by Genki Takabayshi Roshi in Seattle, Washington.

United Kingdom
The lineage of Hakuyu Taizan Maezumi Roshi is represented in the UK by the White Plum Sangha UK.

Throssel Hole Buddhist Abbey was founded as a sister monastery to Shasta Abbey in California by Master Reverend Jiyu Kennett Roshi. It has a number of dispersed priories and centres. Jiyu Kennett, an Englishwoman, was ordained as a priest and Zen master in Shoji-ji, one of the two main Soto Zen temples in Japan. The Order is called the Order of Buddhist Contemplatives. There are several affiliated temples across the UK, including the Norwich Zen Buddhist Priory.

Taisen Deshimaru Roshi's lineage is known in the UK as IZAUK (International Zen Association UK).

The Zen Centre in London is connected to the Buddhist Society.

Zenways is a Rinzai school organisation in South London. It is led by Daizan Roshi a British teacher who received Dharma transmission from Shinzan Miyamae Roshi. 

The Western Chan Fellowship is an association of lay Chán practitioners based in the UK. They are registered as a charity in England and Wales, but also have contacts in Europe, principally in Norway, Poland, Germany, Croatia, Switzerland and the US.

See also
 Buddhism
 Outline of Buddhism
 Timeline of Buddhism
 List of Buddhists
 Buddhism in Japan
 Buddhist modernism
 Chinese Chán

Notes

References

Sources

Printed sources

Web-sources

Further reading
Modern classics
 Paul Reps & Nyogen Senzaki, Zen Flesh, Zen Bones
 Philip Kapleau, The Three Pillars of Zen
 Shunryu Suzuki, Zen Mind, Beginner's Mind

Classic historiography
 Dumoulin, Heinrich (2005), Zen Buddhism: A History. Volume 1: India and China. World Wisdom Books. 
 Dumoulin, Heinrich (2005), Zen Buddhism: A History. Volume 2: Japan. World Wisdom Books. 

Critical historiography
 
 Victoria, Brian Daizen (2006), Zen at War. Lanham e.a.: Rowman & Littlefield Publishers, Inc. (Second Edition)
 
 Mcrae, John (2003), Seeing through Zen. Encounter, Transformation, and Genealogy in Chinese Chan Buddhism. The University Press Group Ltd . 
 McMahan, David L. (2008), The Making of Buddhist Modernism. Oxford University Press. 

(Japanese) Zen as living religious institution and practice

External links
Overview
 Zen Buddhism WWW Virtual Library
 The Zen Site

Rinzai-zen
 Joint Council for Rinzai and Obaku Zen
 The International Research Institute for Zen Buddhism

Soto-zen
 Website on Soto Zen

Sanbo Kyodan
 Sanbo Kyodan Homepage

Critical Zen-practice
 David Chapman
 Brad Warner
 Against the stream

Zen-centers
 
 Zen centers of the world
 Zen centers

Texts
 Sacred-text.com's collection of Zen texts
 Buddhanet's collection of Zen texts
 Shambhala Sun Zen Articles 
 Kyoto and Japanese Buddhism by Tokushi Yusho. Introduction to Zen culture in Kyoto.

Critical Zen Research
 Steven Heine (2007), A Critical Survey of Works on Zen since Yampolsky
 Homepage of Robert H. Sharf

 Japanese